Axel Schylström (born 24 February 1993) is a Swedish singer. He first came to prominence in 2015 while competing on season eleven of Swedish Idol, where he placed fourth. In 2017, he competed in Melodifestivalen 2017, with the song "När ingen ser".

Life and career

Early life
Schylström was born in 1993 in Norrköping. In 2012, he was involved in a serious accident after climbing to the top of a train and coming into contact with power lines. He received a 16,000 volt electric shock which resulted in burns on 70% of his body.

Music career
Schylström began his music career in 2015, after being selected to compete in season eleven of Swedish Idol. He progressed through the competition, until getting eliminated ninth in the live shows, placing 4th.

Melodifestivalen 2017
In 2016, he was confirmed to be taking part in Melodifestivalen 2017 with the song "När ingen ser". He competed in the fourth semi-final, held on 25 February 2017, where he qualified to andra chansen. In andra chansen, held on 4 March, he competed against Lisa Ajax and her song "I Don't Give A" for a spot in the final, but lost the duel.

Melodifestivalen 2023
In November 2022, Axel alondside with other 27 singers was confirmed to take part in Melodifestivalen 2023. On 25 February 2023, he performed his song "Gorgeous" in the fourth semi-final. Schylström came up 4th in the second round of voting, only one point away from qualifying to the second chance.

Discography

Singles

References

1993 births
Living people
People from Norrköping
Swedish pop singers
Swedish-language singers
Idol (Swedish TV series) participants
21st-century Swedish singers
21st-century Swedish male singers
Melodifestivalen contestants of 2023
Melodifestivalen contestants of 2017